Oleh Serhiyovych Tsarkov (born 22 March 1988) is a Ukrainian sports shooter. He competed in the men's 10 metre air rifle event at the 2016 Summer Olympics.

References

External links
 

1988 births
Living people
Ukrainian male sport shooters
Olympic shooters of Ukraine
Shooters at the 2016 Summer Olympics
Place of birth missing (living people)
European Games competitors for Ukraine
Shooters at the 2019 European Games
Shooters at the 2020 Summer Olympics
21st-century Ukrainian people